Greatrex Newman (3 July 1892 – 27 January 1984) was an English writer, song-writer and screenwriter.

He was born in Manchester, England and died in Eastbourne.

Selected works
 Mr. Whittington (1934, West end)

References

External links
 

English male screenwriters
English lyricists
1892 births
1984 deaths
Writers from Manchester
20th-century English screenwriters
20th-century English male writers